The orange blossom is the fragrant flower of the Citrus sinensis (orange tree). It is used in perfume making and has been written about as an aphrodisiac. It is traditionally associated with good fortune and joy, and has been popular in bridal bouquets and head wreaths for weddings. Orange blossom essence is an important component in the making of perfume. The petals of orange blossom can also be made into the delicately scented orange flower water (as an alternative to rose water), a common part of both French cuisine and Middle Eastern cuisine (most often as an ingredient in desserts and baked goods). It's also present in hispanic culinary traditions, with notable examples being Mexican Pan de muerto and Spanish Roscón de Reyes.

In the United States, orange flower water is often used to make orange blossom scones and marshmallows and is the state flower of Florida.

Orange blossom honey (citrus honey) is produced by putting beehives in the citrus groves during blooming period. This also pollinates seeded citrus varieties. Orange blossom honey is highly prized and tastes much like the fruit.

In Spain, fallen blossoms are dried and then used to make tea and the orange blossom gives its touristic nickname to the Costa del Azahar ("orange-blossom coast"), the Castellon seaboard.

A French electronic and world music band has taken the name Orange Blossom.

Gallery

References

Oranges (fruit)
Symbols of Florida